Benawa or banawa is a type of ship from Gowa, an old principality in the southwest corner of Sulawesi, Indonesia. The earliest record of this vessel is from Hikayat Banjar, which was written in or not long after 1663. In the present, this vessel is already extinct; being replaced by vessels with a similar hull, namely palari and padewakang.

Etymology
The word benawa or banawa comes from the kawi Javanese language, which means boat or ship. In the old Javanese language the word banawa means perahu or ship. In different languages, the word may refer to a different type of vessel, depending on the context of the sentence.

Description
The benawa was made for transporting horses and buffaloes. The hull is wide with a convex keel, with a high front and back stem and sternpost. On either side, there are paths attached to a number of transverse beams that are attached to the supports. The secondary function of these beams is to divide the deck space into equal compartments for animals. The deck above the "stable" consist of bamboo lattice.

It is steered with 2 quarter rudders, with helmsmen standing on the outboard galleries. The rudders are mounted on heavy crossbeams in such a way as to allow rapid emergency release. There is a cramped cabin for the captain below the poop deck. The vessel has 2 to 3 masts, both are three-legged posts with the hind legs attached to heavy tabernacles. The mast can be lowered easily if the forelegs pop out of the hooks that hold them in place. The sails are tanja and made with karoro matting. With European influence in the latter centuries, western-styled sails can also be used. In the past, Makassarese sailors may sail them as far as New Guinea and Singapore.

See also 

 Toop
 Padewakang
 Jong
 Golekan

References

Indigenous boats
Boats of Indonesia
Indonesian inventions
Sailboat types
Sailing ship types
Sailing ships
Two-masted ships
Three-masted ships
Sulawesi
Tall ships
14th-century ships